The Glen Campbell Goodtime Hour was an American music and comedy television variety show hosted by singer Glen Campbell from January 29, 1969, to June 13, 1972, on CBS. He was offered the show after he hosted a 1968 summer replacement for The Smothers Brothers Comedy Hour. Campbell used "Gentle on My Mind" as the theme song of the show.

The show was one of the few shows with rural audience appeal to survive CBS's rural purge of 1971, a survival made more unusual because it had fallen out of the top 30 shows that season. Reruns of the show are in the library of free over-the-top services Pluto TV and Shout! Factory TV.

Nielsen Ratings
NOTE: The highest average rating for the series is in bold text.

Home media
One full episode and several highlights of other episodes of The Glen Campbell Goodtime Hour have been released on two videos and one DVD.

See also
 The Glen Campbell Music Show

References

External links

Glen Campbell
1960s American variety television series
1970s American variety television series
1969 American television series debuts
1972 American television series endings
CBS original programming
English-language television shows